Výsluní (earlier also Suniperk) is a town in Chomutov District in the Ústí nad Labem Region of the Czech Republic. It has about 300 inhabitants.

Administrative parts
Hamlets of Kýšovice, Sobětice, Třebíška, Úbočí and Volyně are administrative parts of Výsluní.

Geography
It briefly borders Germany in the north. It lies in the Ore Mountains. The Prunéřovský stream springs in the municipal territory and flows through the town to the east, which then turn to the southwest and forms the municipal border.

History
Výsluní was founded as a mining settlement. Silver, copper, tin and lead ores had been mined in the vicinity of Výsluní since the 14th century. Výsluní itself was founded in the 16th century, the first written mention is from 1547. In 1565, it was referred to as a market town, and in 1584, it became a mining town.

Sights

The town is known for the Church of Saint Wenceslaus, the largest church in the Upper Ore Mountains, popularly known as the Ore Mountains Cathedral. It dominates the town and is visible on the southern slope of the mountains far into the Most Basin.

The town hall is an Empire style building from 1846.

In popular culture
The town's church appeared in many film works: The Borgias, Henri 4, Year of the Devil, Forgotten Light, Thirty Cases of Major Zeman, and Feuer frei! music video.

Notable people
Anton Tausche (1838–1898), German Bohemian politician; honorary citizen of Výsluní

References

External links

Cities and towns in the Czech Republic
Populated places in Chomutov District
Towns in the Ore Mountains